HMS Tees was a  28-gun sixth rate post ship, launched in Bideford in 1817. 
She was used as the "Mariners' Church" permanently moored in St Georges Dock, Liverpool, from 1827 until she sank on 6 June 1872.

References

Bibliography 
 Rif Winfield. British Warships in the Age of Sail 1793–1817: Design, Construction, Careers and Fates. 2nd edition, Seaforth Publishing, 2008. .
 Liverpool: Churches, in A History of the County of Lancaster: Volume 4, ed. William Farrer and J Brownbill (London, 1911), pp. 43–52. British History Online http://www.british-history.ac.uk/vch/lancs/vol4/pp43-52.

External links
 
 Logs of His Majesty's Ships Phaeton, Tees, and Conqueror, C0309, Special Collections Research Center, George Mason University Libraries, http://scrc.gmu.edu/finding_aids/royalnavy.html

 

Conway-class post ships
1817 ships
Ships built in Devon
Maritime incidents in June 1872